Dermacoccus abyssi is a piezotolerant bacterium from the genus of Dermacoccus which has been isolated from sediments from the Mariana Trench.

References

 

Micrococcales
Bacteria described in 2006